Ternopil urban hromada is a hromada of Ukraine, in Ternopil Raion of Ternopil Oblast. Its administrative center is Ternopil. Population:

History 
The amalgamated hromada was created November 14, 2018 by uniting 5 rural councils — Kobzarivka (villages Kobzarivka, Vertelka), Kurivtsi (village Kurivtsi), Malashivtsi (villages Malashivtsi, Ivankivtsi) and Chernykhiv (villages Chernykhiv, Hliadky, Pleskivtsi) of Zboriv Raion with Ternopil city council (city of regional significance).

On February 7, 2020, by the decision of the session of the Ternopil City Council, another community of Zboriv Raion was added to the Ternopil Hromada — Horodyshche Rural Council (v. Horodyshche and Nosivtsi).

Ternopil became first among all regional (oblast) administrative centers that created amalgamated hromada. Until 18 July 2020, Ternopil was designated as a city of oblast significance. As part of the administrative reform of Ukraine, which reduced the number of raions of Ternopil Oblast to three, the city and the hromada were merged into Ternopil Raion.

Subdivisions and Population

Ternopil City Council
city Ternopil — 225 004
Horodyshche Rural Council
v. Horodyshche — 111
v. Nosivtsi — 95
Kobzarivka Rural Council
v. Kobzarivka — 320
v. Vertelka — 340
Kurivtsi Rural Council
v. Kurivtsi — 645
Malashivtsi Rural Council
v. Malashivtsi — 240
v. Ivankivtsi — 303
Chernykhiv Rural Council
v. Chernykhiv — 378
v. Hliadky — 210
v. Pleskivtsi — 140

Notes:
 v. stands for village

Leader
Serhiy Nadal — the mayor of Ternopil, the head of the hromada

References

External links

Official website. Ternopil city 
Ternopil community statute. Ternopil city.
Ternopil city community. Gromada.info.

 
States and territories established in 2018
2018 establishments in Ukraine